The Nations' Cup was held in 2003 for men and 2001 for women. The Nations’ Cup was a one-off event organised on the occasion of the 10th anniversary of the EHF.

Men's tournament

Women's tournament

External links 
 

 

European Handball Federation competitions